Bondy Chiu Hok-yee (born 31 March 1971 in Hong Kong) is an actress and singer in Hong Kong. She is best known for her role as Lam Yuk-lo in the long-running TVB series Virtues of Harmony.

On 10 December 2008, her new album titled Ting (Chinese word means listen) was released after a long break from the music industry.

Albums
Rebel For Love Song (1994)
Every Two Seconds (1995)
Love More Being More Afraid.... (1996)
Finding a Person (1997)
I Said I Will Make You Happy (1998)
Inside (1999)
Slower Is Better (2000)
Be Right Back – Best Selection (CD+DVD) (2005)
Slower Is Better (Reissue Version) (2007)
Listen (2008)
Listen & Listen (2009)
Trinity (2011)
Chanteur (2012)

Filmography

Television series

Film

References

External links
Official website

Bondy Chiu on Sina Weibo

20th-century Hong Kong actresses
21st-century Hong Kong actresses
Living people
TVB actors
Cantopop singers
1971 births
21st-century Hong Kong women singers